DVD formats describe the physical properties of the optical disc and how data is stored and manipulated on the disc. The formats are varied according to use, with the largest differences being whether or not the disc is written to. Within each use category, there are often competing formats or implementations.

Non-recordable formats
DVD-ROM: These are pressed similarly to CDs. The reflective surface is silver or gold colored. They can be single-sided/single-layered, single-sided/double-layered, double-sided/single-layered, or double-sided/double-layered. , new double-sided discs have become increasingly rare. 
DVD-D: Self-destructing disposable DVD format introduced in 2008. Like EZ-D, it is sold in an airtight package, and begins to destroy itself by oxidation after several hours.
DVD Plus: combines both DVD and CD technologies by providing the CD layer and a DVD layer. Not to be confused with the DVD+ formats below.

Recordable formats, supported by the DVD Forum
DVD-R for Authoring: a special-purpose DVD-R used to record DVD masters, which can then be duplicated to pressed DVDs by a duplication plant. They require a special DVD-R recorder, and are not often used nowadays since many duplicators can now accept ordinary DVD-R masters. 
DVD-R (strictly called DVD-R for General): can record up to 4.7 GB in a similar fashion to a CD-R disc. Once recorded and finalized it can be played by most DVD-ROM players. 
DVD-RW: can record up to 4.7 GB in a similar fashion to a CD-RW disc. 
DVD-R DL: a derivative of DVD-R that uses double-layer recordable discs to store up to 8.5 GB of data.
DVD-RW DL: a derivative of DVD-RW that uses double-layer recordable discs to store up to 8.5 GB of data.
DVD-RAM (current specification is version 2.1): 2.6 GB, 4.7 GB or 9.4 GB (double-sided) discs compatible with only a small proportion of other-format DVD drives. DVD-RAM discs were originally typically housed in a cartridge, though these are now less commonly required. Discs can be removed from their caddy and used in compatible standard-tray drives. Rewritable many more times than other rewritable formats.
DVD-AR: Recordable version of DVD-Audio

Recordable formats, supported by the DVD+RW Alliance
DVD+R: can record up to 4.7 GB, at up to 16× speed. As with DVD-R it can only be recorded on once.
DVD+RW: can record up to 4.7 GB at up to 16× speed. Since it is rewritable it can be overwritten several times. It does not need special "pre-pits" or finalization to be played in a DVD player.
DVD+R DL: a derivate of DVD+R that uses dual-layer recordable discs to store up to 8.5 GB of data.
DVD+RW DL: a derivate of DVD+RW that uses dual-layer recordable discs to store up to 8.5 GB of data.

Recordable format compatibility
DVD drives from 2004 onward should be able to read either of the competing recordable formats; older drives may read DVD+R discs better. , DVD drives typically allow writing to both DVD-R[W] and DVD+R[W] discs, making the difference largely irrelevant to the average consumer.

Application formats
VR Mode, also known as Video Recording mode, is a new format that allows editing and deleting of titles and has defect management. This mode is used by the DVD-RAM and DVD-RW formats. Because it is newer than DVD Video mode, it can only be played back in more recent DVD players that support it.

Video mode is the standard DVD video mode format used by DVD movies. Because the DVD Video format was invented before DVDs were recordable it doesn't allow editing of the disc, doesn't support defect management and is therefore not as robust. Space from deleted titles may not be fully reclaimed until the disc is completely erased. It is compatible with most DVD players. It is used on DVD-RW and DVD-R discs, but has never used for DVD-RAM. Most (but not all) recorders that use DVD-RW will offer the choice of VR mode or Video mode.

+VR was introduced by Philips for use on DVD+RW. The idea was to maintain compatibility with the DVD Video format so it could be played elsewhere, but try and introduce some features as found in the VR mode used on DVD-RW/DVD-RAM. DVD+RW normally uses this mode in set-top recorders. It doesn't need a separate finalise step to play in other DVD recorders; finalisation is just done in the background, which makes it bit easier to use (i.e. you can't forget to do it), but it does put extra wear on the disc, as the same area of the disc is updated every time it is used. Due to DVD-Video not being able to take advantage of defect management and the extra overhead of background finalising after each edit or recording, the +VR mode has always been the least reliable, and the editing features may be missing on some DVD recorders to make it more robust.

Because Video Mode and VR mode are Forum standards, they are only used when recording to DVD approved formats i.e. DVD-RAM/DVD-RW/DVD-R discs. DVD+RW isn't approved by the DVD Forum and manufacturers can't get a license for it to use the above modes, leading Philips to introducing their own +VR mode for use with DVD+RW.

References

DVD